Hilal is a given name. People with the name include:

Given name
 Hilal ibn Ali, one of the sons of Ali
 Hilal Altınbilek (born 1991), Turkish actress
 Hilal Asadov (1908–?), Azerbaijani-Soviet statesman
 Hilal Başkol (born 1995), Turkish football player
 Hilal Cebeci (born 1976), Turkish pop singer
 Hilal Çetinkaya (born 1997), Turkish football player
 Hilal Elver, Turkish academic
 Hilal El-Helwe (born 1994), Lebanese football player
 Hilal Hilal (born 1966), Syrian politician
 Hilal Hemed Hilal (born 1994), Tanzanian swimmer
 Hilal Hussain, Pakistani military officer
 Hilal Khashan (born 1951), Palestinian-American scholar
 Hilal Mammadov (born 1959), Azerbaijani journalist 
 Hilal Ben Moussa (born 1992), Dutch-Moroccan football player 
 Hilal Musa (born 1990), Palestinian football player
 Hilal Naqvi (born 1950), Pakistani poet 
 Hilal Ahmed Rather, Indian military officer
 Hilal al-Sabi' (969–1056), historian, bureaucrat, and writer of Arabic
 Hilal bin Ali Al Sabti (born 1972), Omani physician
 Hilal Saeed (born 1982), Emirati football player
 Hilal Tuba Tosun Ayer (born 1970), Turkish football referee

Middle name
 Feride Hilal Akın (born 1996), Turkish musician

See also
 Hilal (surname)

Arabic masculine given names
Turkish feminine given names
Pakistani masculine given names
Indian masculine given names